Kosalar (also, Kasalar) is a village in the Lankaran Rayon of Azerbaijan. The village forms part of the municipality of Bala Şürük.

References 

Populated places in Lankaran District